Paul Osland (born 1 January 1964) is a retired Canadian middle-distance runner who specialised in the 800 metres. He competed in the men's 4 × 400 metres relay at the 1988 Summer Olympics.

References

1964 births
Living people
Athletes (track and field) at the 1988 Summer Olympics
Canadian male sprinters
Canadian male middle-distance runners
Olympic track and field athletes of Canada
Pan American Games track and field athletes for Canada
Commonwealth Games competitors for Canada
Athletes (track and field) at the 1987 Pan American Games
Athletes (track and field) at the 1990 Commonwealth Games
Sportspeople from Downey, California